Fiedorowicz is a surname. Notable people with the surname include:

 C. J. Fiedorowicz (born 1991), American football player
 Czesław Fiedorowicz (born 1958), Polish politician

See also
 Fedorowicz
 Taras Fedorovych

Polish-language surnames
Patronymic surnames
Surnames from given names